Henry Peacham (1546–1634), sometimes called Henry Peacham the Elder, was an English curate, best known for his treatise on rhetoric entitled The Garden of Eloquence, first published in 1577. He lived at Leverton-in-Holland, in Lincolnshire, and was the father of Henry Peacham the Younger, who also became an author.

Further reading
Shawn Smith, "Henry Peacham the Elder," The Dictionary of Literary Biography, Volume 236: British Rhetoricians and Logicians, 1500–1660, First Series, Detroit: Gale, 2001, pp. 188–201.
Willard R. Espy, The Garden of Eloquence: A Rhetorical Bestiary, New York: Dutton, 1983
Alan R. Young, "Henry Peacham, Author of The Garden of Eloquence (1577): A Biographical Note," Notes and Queries, vol. 24, 1977, pp. 503–507

Notes

References

External links
Henry Peacham, The Garden of Eloquence (at silva rhetoricae – A guide to rhetoric, by Dr. Gideon Burton, Brigham Young University).

Rhetoric theorists
English writers
16th-century English writers
English male writers
1546 births
1634 deaths